The State University of Music and Performing Arts Stuttgart is a professional school for musicians and performing artists in Stuttgart, Germany. Founded in 1857, it is one of the oldest schools of its kind in Germany.

History 
The school was founded in 1857 as "Stuttgarter Musikschule" (Stuttgart music school) by Sigmund Lebert, Immanuel Faißt, Wilhelm Speidel and Ludwig Stark. It was named a conservatory in 1865. From 1869 it was named "Königliches Konservatorium für Musik" (Royal conservatory of music) of the Kingdom of Württemberg, and from 1921 "Württembergische Hochschule für Musik" (Württemberg university of music).

Notable teachers and students 

 Iveta Apkalna
 Nicola Bulfone
 Adelaide Casely-Hayford
 Cecil Coles
 Johann Nepomuk David
 Jörg Demus
 Melanie Diener (born 1967), soprano
 Árpád Doppler (1884–1927)
 Jörg Faerber (1929–2022), conductor
 Sylvia Geszty (1934–2018), soprano
 Karl Ludwig Gerok (1906–1975), organist
 Percy Goetschius (1873)
 Harry Plunket Greene
 Hans Grischkat (1903–1977), church musician, professor
 Natalia Gutman, cellist
 Joseph Haas (born 1916)
 Eugen Haile (1873–1933), composer
 Luise Jaide
 Udo Kasemets
 Maria Kalesnikava, Music teacher, political activist
 Erhard Karkoschka
 Gustav Kastropp
 Edgar Stillman Kelley (1880)
  Eun Sun Kim
 Richard Rudolf Klein (1921–2011)
 Helmut Lachenmann
 Nathan Laube
 Kolja Lessing (born 1961)
 Karl Marx
 Barry McDaniel (1930–2018)
 Elke Neidhardt (1941–2013)
 Lauren Newton (1974)
 Anja Petersen
 Marlis Petersen
 Felix Petyrek
 Dionys Pruckner
 Sigurd Rascher
 Hermann Reutter
 Harald Schmidt
 Benyamin Sönmez
 Ewandro Stenzowski (born 1984)
 Marco Stroppa
 Hermann Suter
 Ernest Torrence
 Kathe Volkart-Schlager
 Michael Volle (born 1960)
 Karl Wendling (born 1929)
 Florian Wiek (born 1972)
 Yehuda Yannay
 Karl Maria Zwißler

Library 
The university library currently consists of 18,000 books, 80,000 scores and 9,000 recordings.

References

External links

Official website in English

 
Music schools in Germany
Education in Stuttgart
1857 establishments in Germany
Educational institutions established in 1857
Arts organizations established in 1857
19th-century establishments in Württemberg
Universities and colleges in Baden-Württemberg